The Panchagarh Express (Train no. 793-794) is a non-stop intercity train which runs between Dhaka (capital of Bangladesh) and the most northern Panchagarh District. The train connects the capital to northern Bengal.

History 
Prime Minister Sheikh Hasina inaugurated this service by videoconference from Dhaka on 25 May 2019. This named train service will run seven days a week.

Schedule 
Panchagarh Express begins its journey from Kamalapur railway station at 22:45. It stops at the Airport railway station, Dhaka at 23:17, and another at Santaher railway station at 04:15. It usually reaches Parbatipur at 06:00. and Dinajpur at 06:37. It makes another stop at Pirganj railway station at 07:23. It reaches Thakurgaon at 07:50 and its final destination, Panchagarh, at 08:50.

The reverse journey starts from Panchagarh at 12.30; Thakurgaon Road at 13:10; Pirganj railway station at 13:35 and reaches Kamalapur Railway Station at 21.55pm. On its return route, it stops at Thakurgaon, Dinajpur, Parbitpur and Dhaka Airport stations. The approximate times are 1.53pm, 3.02pm, 3.55pm and 10.03pm respectively.

Coach composition 
This named train has a total of 12 coaches with one AC cabin, one AC chair, 7 Shovan chair cars, Power Car and Prayer rooms, Guard Break and 2 Food Coach cars.

Seat distribution 
Total seats are 896 from Panchagarh and 871 from Dhaka where 30% seats is reserved for the Panchagarh, 25% for Thakurgaon and 30% and 15% for Dinajpur and Parbatipur respectively.

Halts 
The train makes stops at 6 stations. They are-
 Panchagarh
 Thakurgaon
 Dinajpur
 Parbatipur 
  Joypurhat 
 Natore railway station, Natore 
  Santahar 
 Airport railway station, Dhaka
 Kamalapur railway station

See also 
 Benapole Express
 Drutajan Express

References

External links

Named passenger trains of Bangladesh